Chaetodiadema tuberculatum is a species of sea urchins of the Family Diadematidae. Their armour is covered with spines. Chaetodiadema tuberculatum was first scientifically described in 1909 by Hubert Lyman Clark.

See also 

 Chaetodiadema keiense
 Chaetodiadema pallidum
 Chondrocidaris brevispina

References 

Animals described in 1909
Diadematidae